American Aquarium is an American alternative country band from Raleigh, North Carolina, United States.

Background
Formed in 2006, the band derived its name from the Wilco song, “I Am Trying to Break Your Heart,” and is led by band founder and lead vocalist/ guitarist BJ Barham. A new lineup was announced in April 2017 with new faces joining the ranks: Crooks drummer Joey Bybee, Damn Quails bass player Ben Hussey and guitarist Shane Boeker – all from Texas – along with Nashville pedal-steel player Adam Kurtz, who also fronts Music City's experimental Buck Owens tribute Buck N' Stuff.  Bybee left in August 2018 and was replaced by Nashville-based drummer Matty Alger, who in turn left in February 2019. Kurtz left the band after the Mile Zero fest in January 2019, and Hussey left in July 2019.

American Aquarium has released seven albums, including their most critically acclaimed album to date, 2012’s Burn. Flicker. Die.. According to American Songwriter, 'It’s a record for anyone who creates art, even if recognition and a stable living may never come of it".

Their first album, Antique Hearts, was released in 2006, followed by The Bible and the Bottle in 2008.  The band continued to tour extensively, playing around 250 shows a year. They began building a wider and more varied fan base beyond their native state.

Their sophomore effort received some critical attention, and that same year the band released the minimalist live EP Bones, recorded in a friend’s living room.  Barham wrote the songs in the wake of a break-up, helping to cement a familiar theme of women who either got away or did the protagonist wrong.  Their next album was Dances for the Lonely. Released by Last Chance Records in 2009, it featured one of their fan favorites, “I Hope He Breaks Your Heart.” Small Town Hymns, released in 2010, brought more favorable reviews and continued comparisons to Bruce Springsteen, Whiskeytown, and Lucero.

In 2012, American Aquarium released two albums: Live in Raleigh and Burn. Flicker. Die., which garnered considerable praise from music critics and fans.  Produced by Jason Isbell, formerly of Drive By Truckers, the album was originally intended to be the band’s last, but they now have no plans for retirement. Barham says,"It's kind of ironic that the record about not making it is the record that helped us make it." "Throughout, the music crackles and snarls with a raw viscerality that carries distinct echoes of the Drive-By Truckers and early-seventies Rolling Stones—boozy, swaggering closing track “Saturday Nights” even sports a signature crunch-riff that’d put a big smile on Keith Richards’ face." Burn. Flicker. Die. was nominated for "Best Americana/Roots Album” and “Best Album Artwork” in the 2013 Lone Star Music Awards.

The band released their sixth original album, Wolves, in February 2015.  The band's fans helped raise $24,000 through a Kickstarter project to help fund the album's production, and the album was recorded in Asheville, North Carolina at Echo Mountain.

On November 25, 2016, Live at Terminal West was released by the band from a live show recording in November 2015 at Terminal West in Atlanta, Georgia.

On June 1, 2018, American Aquarium released Things Change with producer John Fullbright.

On May 1, 2020, American Aquarium released Lamentations with producer Shooter Jennings. Barham wrote the lyrics by comparing Jeremiah's book of Lamentations to modern day America.

On June 17, 2022, American Aquarium made their debut at the Ryman Auditorium.

Band members

Line up change
On April 2, 2017, Barham announced a lineup change via Facebook, saying "I started American Aquarium in my college dorm room back in 2005 with the hopes of building a band to bring my songs to life,” Barham says. “Over the last 12 years I’ve played 3000+ shows with 26 different members of American Aquarium. We’ve been to 13 countries, 46 states and have recorded 9 albums under the American Aquarium name. It is with a heavy heart that I’m here to say the current lineup of American Aquarium is no more."

Current line up 

As of April 2020 
 BJ Barham – acoustic guitar, vocals (2005–present)
 Shane Boeker – electric guitar, vocals (2017–present)
 Rhett Huffman – organ, piano (2019–present)
 Neil Jones – pedal steel guitar (2019–present)
 Ryan Van Fleet – drums, percussion (2019–present)
 Alden Hedges – bass guitar, vocals (2019–present)

Discography 
 Antique Hearts (2006)
 The Bible and the Bottle (2008)
 Bones (2008)
 Dances for the Lonely (Last Chance Records, 2009)
 Small Town Hymns (Last Chance Records, 2010)
 Live in Raleigh (Last Chance Records, 2012)
 Burn. Flicker. Die. (Last Chance Records, 2012)
 Wolves (Independent, 2015)
 Live at Terminal West (Independent, 2016)
 Things Change (New West Records, 2018)
 Lamentations  (New West Records, 2020) (No. 16 - US Top Country Albums; No. 133 - US Billboard 200)
 Slappers, Bangers & Certified Twangers, Vol. 1 (2021)
 Slappers, Bangers & Certified Twangers, Vol. 2 (2021)
 Chicamacomico (2022)

Collaborations
 American Aquarium appear on "Middle of America", a track from Hailey Whitters' 2022 album Raised.

References

External links
Official website

Musical groups from Raleigh, North Carolina
Musical groups established in 2008